Dostizheniye is a rural locality (a settlement) in Klyazminskoye Rural Settlement, Kovrovsky District, Vladimir Oblast, Russia. The population was 893 as of 2010. There are 14 streets.

Geography 
Dostizheniye is located 14 km east of Kovrov (the district's administrative centre) by road. Gostyukhino is the nearest rural locality.

References 

Rural localities in Kovrovsky District